BET Presents: The Encore (also known as The Encore) is an American reality television series, which is produced by Kingdom Reign Entertainment for BET. The show chronicles 9 former R&B girl-group members & recording artists as they form a supergroup to create an album within 30 days. The series stars Shamari Devoe (of Blaque), 702 sisters Irish and LeMisha Grinstead, Nivea, Cherish twins Fallon & Felisha King, Pamela Long (of Total), Danity Kane's Aubrey O'Day, and Kiely Williams (of 3LW & The Cheetah Girls fame). Announced to premiere on June 9, 2021, the series drew 2.5 million viewers in its premiere across all BET-related networks.

Production
Interest in the development of the series grew after clips leaked from an unaired pilot titled Last Chance: Girl Group went viral. Snippets of former Destiny's Child member, Farrah Franklin and 3LW's Kiely Williams went viral in 2020. BET greenlit the series for a full 10-episode season, and announced its premiere date on May 19, 2021. Filming for the series took place in March 2021.

Cast

Notes
 Key:  = Member joins the group.
 Key:  = Member is in the group this episode.
 Key:  = Member leaves the group.

Episodes

References

BET original programming
2021 American television series debuts
2020s American reality television series